Season ten of the television program American Experience originally aired on the PBS network in the United States on October 5, 1997 and concluded on April 13, 1998. This is the tenth season to feature David McCullough as the host, and the show celebrated its 10th anniversary. The season contained nine new episodes and began with the first part of the film Truman.

Episodes

References

1997 American television seasons
1998 American television seasons
American Experience